The Puma Trophy is an international rugby union competition between Argentina and Australia. The trophy is a bronzed statue of a puma. Argentina and Australia first played against each other in 1979 and the trophy itself was established in 2000. 

In 2012, it became a part of The Rugby Championship. The first draw between the two sides since the creation of the Puma Trophy happened in 2020 (15–15). The next meeting – two weeks later – was also a draw. Subsequently, Australia retained the Trophy for another year.

Statistics 

Notes

Results 
 – Winter Test
 – Spring International

See also

 History of rugby union matches between Argentina and Australia

References

History of rugby union matches between Argentina and Australia
The Rugby Championship trophies
International rugby union competitions hosted by Argentina
International rugby union competitions hosted by Australia
2000 establishments in Argentina
2000 establishments in Australia